Anmol KC is a Nepalese actor. He is the son of a veteran Nepali actor turned director and producer Bhuwan K.C and Nepali actress Sushmita Bomjan (formerly Sushmita K.C.). He started acting in films at a young age, he is now known for his romantic films, namely Hostel (2013), Jerryy (2014), Dreams (2016), Gajalu (2016), Kri (2018), Captain (2019), A Mero Hajur 3 (2019) and A Mero Hajur 4 (2022). Anmol is also one of the highest-paid and commercially successful actors in the Nepali film industry.

Filmography

Awards

References

External links

Living people
Actors from Kathmandu
Nepalese film producers
1994 births
21st-century Nepalese male actors
Khas people
Nepalese male film actors
Nepalese male child actors